NA-48 Islamabad-III is a constituency for the National Assembly of Pakistan.

Area
This constituency consists of mostly rural areas of Islamabad Capital Territory including the residential compartments alongside Islamabad Expressway running up to Rawat and ending at the borders of Rawalpindi. Bani Gala is split into this constituency and NA-53 (Islamabad-II). These areas were previously part of now-abolished constituency of NA-49 Islamabad-II before the delimitation of 2018.

On a more granular basis, following areas are included in this constituency:

Sihala
Rawat
Alipur and Farash
Jandala
Muhrian
Kuri
Pind Begwal
Maira Begwal CH
Tumair
Tarlai Kalan
Tarlai Khurd

Members of Parliament

2002–2018: NA-49 Islamabad-II

2018-2023: NA-52 Islamabad-I

Election 2002 

General elections were held on 10 Oct 2002. Khawaja Kaleem Ahmed of [PMLQ] won by 47,884 votes.

Election 2008 

The result of general election 2008 in this constituency is given below.

Result 
Dr. Tariq Fazal Chaudhary succeeded in the election 2008 and became the member of National Assembly.

Election 2013 

General elections were held on 11 May 2013. Tariq Fazal Chudhary of PML-N easily defended his berth in the National Assembly and was hence re-elected.

Election 2018 

General elections were held on 25 July 2018.

By-election 2023 
A by-election will be held on 16 March 2023 due to the resignation of Khurram Shehzad Nawaz, the previous MNA from this seat.

See also
 NA-47 Islamabad-II
 NA-49 Attock-I

References

External links 
Delimitation 2018 official website Election Commission of Pakistan

54
54